Brazeal  is a surname. Notable people with the surname include:

 Aurelia E. Brazeal (born 1943), American diplomat 
 Tim Brazeal (born 1961), known for a controversial campaign to save the TV series Star Trek Enterprise from cancellation